Kaiveneege Furathama Rey is a 1999 Maldivian drama film co-directed by Mohamed Abdul Hakeem and Mohamed Nasheed. Produced by Hussain Rasheed under Farivaa Films, the film stars Sajna Ahmed, Mohamed Abdul Hakeem and Ahmed Asim in pivotal roles.

Premise
Sameer (Ahmed Asim), the only son of a wealthy businessman, Shamlatheef (Mohamed Abdul Hakeem) rapes their maid, Haajara's (Haajara Abdul Kareem) adopted daughter, Sajna (Sajna Ahmed). Haajara files a defamation case against their family who in return offers a two lack cheque requesting to withdraw their case. Enraged, Haajara and Sajna moves ahead with their complaint while appointing Shamlatheef's son-in-law, Ahmed (Mohamed Saeed) as their lawyer. The family settles the case outside the court and Sameer agrees to marry Sajna since it is his only option to drop the case filed against him by default.

Cast 
 Sajna Ahmed as Sajna
 Mohamed Abdul Hakeem as Shamlatheef
 Ahmed Asim as Sameer
 Haajara Abdul Kareem as Haajara
 Chilhiya Moosa Manik as Doctor
 Sarumeela Fauzy as Latheefa
 Mohamed Saeed as Saeed
 Aishath Haleem as Sameer's girlfriend
 Ahmed Ibrahim as Ahmed
 Aishath Gulfa as Madheeha
 Ahmed Sidhuqee as Abdul Muhusin
 Ahmed Azmeel as a police officer (Special appearance)

See also
 Lists of Maldivian films

References

Maldivian drama films
1999 films
1999 drama films
Dhivehi-language films